State Route 210 (SR-210) is a state route in the U.S. state of Utah that is the access road for Little Cottonwood Canyon and the ski resorts of Alta and Snowbird. The 13.62 mi (21.92 km) highway straddles the southeastern edge of the Salt Lake Valley before it enters the mouth of Little Cottonwood Canyon.

Route description
The highway heads south on Wasatch Boulevard from the point SR-190 turns east from that road onto Fort Union Boulevard. The four-lane undivided highway continues south-southwest before turning south-southeast again past the intersection of 3500 East. The route then turns off of Wasatch Boulevard and onto Little Cottonwood Canyon Road past the junction of Danish Road and turns east-southeast approaching SR-209. The route turns east entering the mouth of Little Cottonwood Canyon and continues east and east-northeast before terminating in Alta.

History

The state legislature defined State Route 210 in 1941 to run from SR-4 (US-40, now I-80) at the mouth of Parley's Canyon south along Wasatch Boulevard to Little Cottonwood Canyon, then east through the canyon to Alta. In 1945, the west end was moved to the intersection of Fort Union Boulevard (then SR-152) and Highland Drive. The route now followed Highland Drive, Creek Road, and Danish Road, rejoining the former alignment at the mouth of Little Cottonwood Canyon. A short piece of Wasatch Boulevard north of 3300 South remained a state highway, as an extension of SR-171, but the remainder was removed from the system. At some point in the 1950s, the connection from Highland Drive to Wasatch Boulevard was moved north from Creek Road and Danish Road to 3500 East and the newly built Bengal Boulevard.  

In 1969, the route was moved to Wasatch Boulevard north of the Little Cottonwood Canyon turnoff, placing the western terminus at SR-152 near the mouth of Big Cottonwood Canyon and removing those portions of Danish Road, Bengal Boulevard, and Highland Drive from the state system. The Alta Bypass Road was added to SR-210 in 1975, providing an alternate route when snow slides close the main roadway. A final extension on the west end was made in 1987, continuing north on Wasatch Boulevard and northwest on a then-proposed limited access extension of 6200 South to I-215. However, a year later, this instead became part of the recently formed SR-190 so that SR-210 would not have to be remileposted.

State Route 229 was defined in 1941, connecting SR-210 near Alta to SR-152 (now SR-190) near Brighton along a proposed roadway. The definition of SR-210 was changed in 1969 to absorb this mountainous route, but in 1994 it was truncated back to Alta, the extension having not been constructed.

Major intersections

References

210
210
 210
National Forest Scenic Byways